Raja Ahmad Zainuddin bin Raja Omar was a Malaysian politician from UMNO. He was the Member of Parliament for Larut from 1999 to 2008 and Member of Perak State Legislative Assembly for Kubu Gajah from 2008 to 2013.

Early career 
He was a blogger for Berita Harian, the Chief editor of Berita Harian Perak from 1988 to 1999 and Advisor for Mingguan Watan. He was also the Director of Ken Holdings Berhad, Muhibbah Engineering (M) Bhd and others. He was also the manager of Perak FC and Vice President of Football Association of Malaysia. He was suspended from 1991 to 1994, 2001 to 2005 and in 2006 due to criticism towards FAM.

Politics 
He was a member of the Perak Public Accounting Committee, Barisan Nasional Supporters Club, Chairman of Commercial Vehicle Licensing Board and Director of Tabung Haji Management Board.

UMNO Larut Crisis 
He was the incumbent Chief of UMNO Larut branch and rejected Hamzah Zainuddin as a candidate for the Larut branch chief election as Hamzah joined the branch after 31 December 2007, which is a breach of UMNO's constitution. At the end, the Secretary-general of UMNO, Tengku Adnan Tengku Mansor had allowed Hamzah to participate in the election.

Election results

Honours
  :
  Grand Knight of the Order of Sultan Ahmad Shah of Pahang (SSAP) – Dato' Sri (2007)

Health 
He had passed away on 9 June 2017 in Hospital KPJ Ipoh.

References 

Malaysian Muslims
United Malays National Organisation politicians
Members of the Dewan Rakyat
Members of the Perak State Legislative Assembly
Malaysian people of Malay descent
Living people
1956 births
2017 deaths